Burns & McDonnell is an American architecture and engineering company based in Kansas City, Missouri, and is owned 100% by its employees. It was established in 1898 by Clinton S. Burns and Robert E. McDonnell, two engineers. In October 2021, it had a workforce of 7,600.

History

Establishment and early history  
Burns & McDonnell was founded by two Stanford University graduates that had experienced successful teamwork while working in Palo Alto. They chose Kansas as it was deemed to provide work for the two engineers. Robert E. McDonnell became the firm's promoter towards the region's municipalities, while Clinton S. Burns focused on the technical aspect. They offered solutions for sewer systems and waterworks.

Armco Steel     
In 1971, the firm was bought by Armco Steel, based in Ohio. As Armco prepared to sell Burns & McDonnell in the early 1980s, its employees opted to buy the company themselves and took on a loan to finance a buyout in 1985. The loan was provided by the United Missouri Bank.

Employee-owned 
Its status as employee owned is considered a factor in producing higher workforce efficiency. The Employee Stock Ownership Plan (ESOP) owns 98% of Burns & McDonnell while management accounts for the remaining 2%. All employees have the right to join the ESOP and are provided shares according to their contribution to the company with a cap of up to $265,000. Its workforce grew from 600 in 1985, to 5,600 in 2016 while its annual revenue rose from $41 million to $2.5 billion in the same timespan. By 2021, it had 7,600 employee-owners and the revenue rose to $5.7 billion in 2022. In 2016, it introduced a flexibility plan, which allowed the employees to shape their workplans in a way that they could take off every second Friday.

Acquisitions 
Originally an engineering company, it has expanded its focus into several areas throughout its history. In 1983, it acquired the C.W. Nofsinger Company, part of the chemical industry, and rebranded it as the Process & Industrial Group (P&I). In 2010, it purchased the specialist in bridge construction Harrington & Cortelyou and in 2012 it purchased AZCO from Wisconsin. AZCO has collaborated with Burns & McDonnell for decades in construction projects and was also 100% owned by its employees. In 2018, Ref-Chem from Baton Rouge, Louisiana was also acquired by Burns & McDonnell.

Industry 
Burns & McDonnell is among the largest Engineering/Architecture companies in the US and a prominent contributor to US market for electrical designs. It is also active in the construction of military facilities, wind and solar energy installations, aviation, health care, and is active in the oil and chemical industry. In 2020 it was involved in raising the levels of twenty-one bridges over the highways I 35 and I 335 in the counties Sumner and Sedgwick in Kansas.

Branches 
The company is headquartered in Kansas City and mainly active in the US, but also internationally. It is represented in over 50 cities across the US, but also has branches in Dubai, Canada, the United Kingdom and India.

Awards 
Burns & McDonnell has received numerous accolades from the American Councils of the Engineering industry and is considered as a good-to-work-for company in the US by Fortune. In 2012, it received the ESOP of the year Award.

References

External links

1898 establishments in Missouri
Employee-owned companies of the United States
Companies based in Kansas City, Missouri